The Louis A. Crandall House at 959 Main St. in Lebanon, Oregon was built in about 1906.  It was listed on the National Register of Historic Places in 1980.

It is a -story house that is the "only example of high style American Foursquare architecture in Lebanon".  It was designed by Albert I. Crandall. It was built by the Crandall Brothers Planing Mill, a company including brothers Louis, Albert, and Ira Crandall.

References

Houses on the National Register of Historic Places in Oregon
Colonial Revival architecture in Oregon
Houses completed in 1906
Houses in Linn County, Oregon
Lebanon, Oregon
National Register of Historic Places in Linn County, Oregon
1906 establishments in Oregon